Franklin Township is the name of seventeen townships in the U.S. state of Indiana:

 Franklin Township, DeKalb County, Indiana
 Franklin Township, Floyd County, Indiana
 Franklin Township, Grant County, Indiana
 Franklin Township, Harrison County, Indiana
 Franklin Township, Hendricks County, Indiana
 Franklin Township, Henry County, Indiana
 Franklin Township, Johnson County, Indiana
 Franklin Township, Kosciusko County, Indiana
 Franklin Township, Marion County, Indiana
 Franklin Township, Montgomery County, Indiana
 Franklin Township, Owen County, Indiana
 Franklin Township, Pulaski County, Indiana
 Franklin Township, Putnam County, Indiana
 Franklin Township, Randolph County, Indiana
 Franklin Township, Ripley County, Indiana
 Franklin Township, Washington County, Indiana
 Franklin Township, Wayne County, Indiana

Indiana township disambiguation pages